Panteón Otero-Martínez, also known as Otero-Martinez Mausoleum, is a mausoleum which was built in 1886.  It is located in the Old Vega Baja Cemetery, in Vega Baja, Puerto Rico.  It was listed on the National Register of Historic Places as "Panteon Otero-Martinez" in 1984.

See also 
 Guzmán Family Pantheon: NRHP listing in Humacao, Puerto Rico
 National Register of Historic Places listings in northern Puerto Rico

References

Buildings and structures on the National Register of Historic Places in Puerto Rico
Neoclassical architecture in Puerto Rico
Vega Baja, Puerto Rico
Buildings and structures completed in 1886
1886 establishments in Puerto Rico
Mausoleums in Puerto Rico
Mausoleums on the National Register of Historic Places